was a district located in northeastern Gunma Prefecture (Kozuke Province), Japan.

Before the day before the dissolution on May 4, 2009, the district contained one village.
 Fujimi (富士見村)

Before Meiji, the district covered the entire foothills of Mount Akagi.

History

After entering Meiji Era, the former shōgun owned lands became Iwahana Prefecture and the former Maebashi Domain lands became Maebashi Prefecture. After the Abolition of the han system in 1871, the entire area became Gunma Prefecture, but due to the changes to the prefecture, the area became Kumagaya Prefecture in 1873 and to Gunma Prefecture in 1876.

Due to the land reforms of 1878, the district was split into two with the Mount Akagi is being the borderline, the northern foothills of Mount Akagi became Kitaseta District while the southern foothills became Minamiseta District. Since the area of Kitaseta District was too small, the district merged into Tone District in 1896. At the same time, Minamiseta District merged with Higashigunma District to recreate Seta District.

Timeline

Seta District(~1878)
 July 22, 1878 - Due to land reforms, Seta District split into Kitaseta and Minamiseta Districts.

Seta District(1896~2009)
 April 1, 1896 - The district was formed when Higashigunma and Minamiseta Districts merged. (17 villages)
 May 24, 1899 - The village of Ōgo was elevated to town status to become the town of Ōgo. (1 town, 16 villages)
 April 1, 1901 - Parts of the village of Kamikawabuchi was merged into the city of Maebashi.
 April 1, 1951 - Parts of Mitsumata, village of Kaigaya, was merged into the city of Maebashi.
 April 1, 1954 - The villages of Kamikawabuchi, Shimokawabuchi, Haga, and Kaigaya were merged into the city of Maebashi. (1 town, 12 villages)
 September 1, 1954 - The village of Nankitsu was merged into the city of Maebashi. (1 town, 11 villages)
 April 1, 1955 - Parts of the village of Kise was merged into the city of Maebashi.
 September 1, 1956 - The villages of Yokono and Shikishima were merged to create the village of Akagi. (1 town, 10 villages)
 February 20, 1957 - The villages of Kise and Arato were merged to create the village of Jōnan. (1 town, 9 villages)
 February 1, 1958 - Parts of the village of Kurohone was merged into the town of town of Ōmama (in Yamada District).
 April 1, 1960 - Parts of the village of Jōnan was merged into the city of Maebashi.
 May 1, 1967 - The village of Jōnan was merged into the city of Maebashi. (1 town, 8 villages)
 December 5, 2004 - The town of Ōgo, and the villages of Kasukawa and Miyagi were merged into the expanded city of Maebashi. (6 villages)
 June 13, 2005 - The villages of Kurohone and Niisato were merged into the city of Kiryū. (4 villages)
 February 20, 2006 - The villages of Akagi and Kitatachibana, the town of Ikaho, and the villages of Komochi and Onogami (both from Kitagunma District), were merged into the expanded city of Shibukawa. (2 villages)
 March 27, 2006 - The village of Azuma was merged with the town of Omama (from Yamada District), and the town of Kasakake (from Nitta District), to create the city of Midori. (1 village)
 May 5, 2009 - The village of Fujimi was merged into the expanded city of Maebashi. Seta District was dissolved as a result of this merger.

District Seta
Seta District